The Principaliy (established in 1847 by David Tudor Evans) was a weekly English language newspaper that was distributed throughout South Wales in the United Kingdom.

The paper was initially produced in Haverfordwest, but moved to Cardiff in 1848. It mainly covered national and religious news.

References

Newspapers published in Wales